Michel Grant (born 14 February 1958) is a Swedish judoka. He competed at the 1980 Summer Olympics and the 1984 Summer Olympics.

References

External links
 

1958 births
Living people
Swedish male judoka
Olympic judoka of Sweden
Judoka at the 1980 Summer Olympics
Judoka at the 1984 Summer Olympics
Sportspeople from Stockholm
20th-century Swedish people